In the State of Palestine disability affects 2.1% of the population, as defined by census. About half of all disabled Palestinians have mobility impairments. Education of children with disabilities is problematic with low school attendance.

Demographics
Disability affects 2.1% of the population of the State of Palestine, a total of 92,710 people, according to the 2017 Population, Housing and Establishments Census. The majority (47,109 people) are affected by mobility impairments, while a fifth are under 18 years old. Geographic distribution is almost evenly split between the West Bank (48%) and the Gaza Strip (52%). 75% live in urban areas, 13% in rural areas, and 12% live in the camps.

Education

In 2017 the illiteracy rate of disabled persons aged 10 years and over was 32%. Disabled males illiteracy rate was 20% compared to 46% for females. In the West Bank the illiteracy rate was 35%, and 29% in the Gaza Strip.

According to the Palestinian Ministry of Education and Higher Education there were 4,823 disabled children in grades one to ten in government schools in the West Bank, and 2,006 in the Gaza Strip, during the 2015–2016 school year.

According to the 2018 State of Palestine Country Report on Out-Of-School Children by UNICEF, children with disabilities are most at risk of exclusion from education.

6 to 9-year-old children
In the 6-9-year-old group about 32.5% children with a disability had never attended school versus only 0.9% of their non-disabled peers. In the Gaza Strip the incidence was 42.5%, while it was 27.7% in the West Bank.

10 to 15 year old children
About 30.2% of 10-15-year-old children with disabilities were excluded from school compared to only 2.3% of their non-disabled peers. About 22.1% of disabled children in this age group had never attended school. Disabled girls in this age group were excluded at higher rates (36.6%) than boys (26.3%). The gender difference is mostly due to 28.5% of girls with disabilities never attending school, versus only 18.3% of boys with disabilities. In the Gaza Strip 33.2% of this group had not attended school while the incidence in the West Bank was 28.3%.

Severity of disability
Children with multiple disabilities are excluded at even higher rates (54.8%) compared to those with a single disability (9.4%). For multi-disabled 6-9-year-old children the non-attendance rate was estimated at 49.2%, and 44.3% for 10-15-year-old age group. The type of disability also affects the rate of exclusion. An estimated 8.6% of those who have physical disabilities were out of school, versus 22.6% with psychological or intellectual disabilities.

Sport 
A Palestinian team has competed at the Summer Paralympic Games since the 2000 Summer Paralympics in Sydney, Australia.

References